Katić is a Serbo-Croatian surname. It may be transcribed as Katich.
It may refer to:

 Branka Katić (born 1970), Serbian actress
 Ilija Katić (born 1945), Serbian football player
 Janko Katić (fl. 1804–1806), Serbian revolutionary
 Mark Katic, (born 1989), Canadian ice hockey player
 Milan Katić, (born 1993), Serbian volleyball player
 Miro Katić (born 1974), Bosnian football player
 Nikola Katić (born 1996), Croatian football player
 Raško Katić (born 1980), Serbian basketball player
 Stana Katic (born 1978), Canadian actress of Serbian ancestry
 Toni Katić, Croatian basketball player

 Simon Katich,  Australian cricketer
 David Katich, Security Lieutenant

See also
Katič (disambiguation)
Catich 

Serbian surnames
Croatian surnames
Matronymic surnames